Kutsi may refer to:

Kutsi (singer) (Ahmet Kutsi Karadoğan), Turkish singer-songwriter
Ahmet Kutsi Tecer, Turkish poet and politician
Kutsi, Rohatyn Raion, a village next to Rohatyn, Ivano-Frankivsk Oblast, Ukraine